UFDC may refer to
United Front for Democratic Change, a rebel alliance based in eastern Chad
University of Florida Digital Collections, digital resources from the University of Florida's library collections as well as partner institutions